Wadsworth Egmont Pohl (born February 13, 1908, in Redlands, California - February 12, 1990, in Los Angeles) was an American engineer and inventor who won a Technical Award in 1964, and was credited with the invention or development of the Sodium vapor process and the bluescreen process.

Life 
Pohl grew up in California San Bernardino County and received his education in California. His most important achievement in the cinematic field he made in 1964 in association with Petro Vlahos and Ub Iwerks in the film Mary Poppins, in which all three named were awarded a Academy Scientific and Technical Award Award of Merit "for the conception and perfection of techniques for Color Traveling Matte Composite Cinematography."

References 

Recipients of the Scientific and Technical Academy Award of Merit
1908 births
1990 deaths
20th-century American inventors
Academy Award for Technical Achievement winners